The 1908–09 Butler Bulldogs men's basketball team represented the Butler University during the 1908–09 college men's basketball season.

Schedule

|-

References

Butler Bulldogs men's basketball seasons
Butler
Butl
Butl